Matamoros Lighthouse is a defunct lighthouse along Matamoros Street, in colonia Centro, Puerto Vallarta, in the Mexican state of Jalisco. A beacon, the structure was built by Roberto Alcazar and inaugurated on August 15, 1932. It operated until June 1978, and upon retirement, was deemed a historic landmark.

In 2006, the structure was remodeled and converted into a lookout with stair access. The structure, now considered a tourist attraction, provides panoramic views of the city and Banderas Bay. It was cleaned and graffiti was removed in 2017.

References

External links

 
 

1932 establishments in Mexico
1978 disestablishments in Mexico
Buildings and structures completed in 1932
Centro, Puerto Vallarta
Lighthouses in Mexico
Tourist attractions in Mexico
Buildings and structures in Puerto Vallarta